The Guwahati–Mariani BG Express is an Express train belonging to Northeast Frontier Railway zone that runs between  and  in India. It is currently being operated with 15665/15666 train numbers on a daily basis. Earlier, the train ran between Guwahati and Dimapur. It was extended to Mariani Junction from 2020.

Service

The 15665/Guwahati–Mariani BG Express has an average speed of 46 km/hr and covers 404 km in  8h 45m. The 15666/Dimapur–Guwahati BG Express has an average speed of 46 km/hr and covers 404 km in 8h 50m.

Route and halts 

The important halts of the train are:

Coach composition

The train has standard ICF rakes with a max speed of 110 kmph. The train consists of 13 coaches:

 1 AC II Tier
 2 AC III Tier
 4 Sleeper coaches
 3 Second Sitting
 2 General Unreserved
 2 Seating cum Luggage Rake

Traction

Both trains are hauled by a Guwahati Loco Shed- based WDM-3A diesel locomotive from Guwahati to Dimapur and vice versa. Now shifted to Malda Town WDM-3A or New Guwahati-based WDM-3D.

Rake sharing

The train shares its rake with 15603/15604 Kamakhya–Ledo Intercity Express, 15669/15670 Nagaland Express and 55601/55602 Kamakhya–Lumding Passenger.

See also 

 Guwahati railway station
 Mariani Junction railway station
 Nagaland Express
 Kamakhya–Ledo Intercity Express
 Kamakhya–Lumding Passenger

Notes

References

External links 

 15665/Guwahati–Mariani BG Express India Rail Info
 15666/Mariani–Guwahati BG Express India Rail Info

Transport in Guwahati
Transport in Dimapur
Express trains in India
Rail transport in Assam
Rail transport in Nagaland